Sarina Farhadi (born 27 April 1998) is an Iranian actress. She is the daughter of Parisa Bakhtavar and Academy Award-winning director Asghar Farhadi.

Career 
In 2011, she won Silver Bear for Best Actress in Berlin International Film Festival for her role in her father's film A Separation, as Termeh. She also won the FIPRESCI Award for best actress along with Leila Hatami and Sareh Bayat at the Palm Springs International Film Festival for her role as Termeh.

Filmography

Film

Television

Awards and nominations

References

External links 
 

1997 births
Living people
People from Tehran
Actresses from Tehran
Iranian film actresses
Iranian child actresses
Iranian television actresses
Silver Bear for Best Actress winners